Bustilloxia is a genus of moths in the family Geometridae.

Species
 Bustilloxia saturata (A. Bang-Haas, 1906)

References
 Bustilloxia at Markku Savela's Lepidoptera and Some Other Life Forms
Natural History Museum Lepidoptera genus database

Microloxiini
Geometrinae
Geometridae genera